Shush Bolagh (also Romanized as Shūsh Bolāgh) is a village in Naqdi Rural District, Meshgin-e Sharqi District, Meshgin Shahr County, Ardabil Province, Iran. At the 2006 census, its population was 124, in 23 families.

References 

Towns and villages in Meshgin Shahr County